Edward Amos "Ted" Irvine (born December 8, 1944) is a Canadian former professional NHL hockey player who was active during the 1960s and 1970s.

Career
Irvine was a left winger. He amassed a total of 331 points in 774 games played over a 15-year professional career. In his NHL career, Irvine played for the Boston Bruins, Los Angeles Kings, New York Rangers, and St. Louis Blues between 1963 and 1977. His jersey number was 27.

Irvine appeared on an episode of the professional wrestling television show AEW Dynamite, on 27 November 2019. He was revealed as a surprise guest for his son, professional wrestler Chris Jericho, to celebrate Thanksgiving. During the appearance, Irvine learnt that they were in Chicago, and went on to taunt the crowd by mentioning the number of times the New York Rangers defeated the Chicago Blackhawks.

Personal life
Irvine is of Scottish ancestry. He is married to Bonnie Davis. He is the father of professional wrestler and musician Chris Irvine, better known by his ring name Chris Jericho, and also has a daughter, Vanessa Gerads, a music teacher.

Awards and achievements
MJHL Co-Goal Scoring Leader (1963)
MJHL First All-Star Team  (1964)
CPHL Championships (1966 and 1967)
Honoured Member of the Manitoba Hockey Hall of Fame
In the 2009 book 100 Ranger Greats, the authors ranked Irvine at No. 74 all-time of the 901 New York Rangers who had played during the team's first 82 seasons.

Career statistics

References

External links

Ted Irvine's biography at Manitoba Hockey Hall of Fame

1944 births
Living people
Boston Bruins players
Canadian ice hockey left wingers
Canadian people of Scottish descent
Los Angeles Kings players
New York Rangers players
St. Boniface Canadiens players
St. Louis Blues players
Ice hockey people from Winnipeg